Major-General Sir William George Lawrence Beynon, KCIE, CB, DSO (5 November 1866 – 9 February 1955) was a British Indian Army officer.

Military career

British forces commanded by Major-General Beynon advanced into Mahsud tribal territory on the 6th.  British forces engaged the Mahsud several days in June. On 25 June 1917, hostilities ceased when the Mahsud sued for peace. Part of the terms were that the Mahsuds had to hand rifles they had stolen, some of these came into the hands of British troops while they were still there. British troops began withdrawing on 12 July. The final peace agreement came on 10 August 1917 with a Mahsud jirga.

Bibliography
Notes

References   

 - Total pages: 628 

1866 births
1955 deaths
Indian Army generals of World War I
Companions of the Distinguished Service Order
British military personnel of the Third Anglo-Afghan War
Indian Staff Corps officers
British military personnel of the Hazara Expedition of 1888
British military personnel of the Chitral Expedition
British military personnel of the Tirah campaign
Knights Commander of the Order of the Indian Empire
Companions of the Order of the Bath